The Greek tortoise (Testudo graeca), also known commonly as the spur-thighed tortoise, is a species of tortoise in the family Testudinidae. Testudo graeca is one of five species of Mediterranean tortoises (genera Testudo and Agrionemys). The other four species are Hermann's tortoise (T. hermanni), the Egyptian tortoise (T. kleinmanni), the marginated tortoise (T. marginata), and the Russian tortoise (A. horsfieldii). The Greek tortoise is a very long-lived animal, achieving a lifespan upwards of 125 years, with some unverified reports up to 200 years.

Geographic range
The Greek tortoise's geographic range includes North Africa, Southern Europe, and Southwest Asia. It is prevalent in the Black Sea coast of the Caucasus (from Anapa, Russia, to Sukhumi, Abkhazia, Georgia, to the south), as well as in other regions of Georgia, Armenia, Iran, and Azerbaijan.

Evolution 
The oldest known definitive fossil is from the Early Pliocene of Greece, but specimens referred to as Testudo cf. graeca are known from the Late and Middle Miocene in Greece and Turkey.

Characteristics
The Greek tortoise (T. g. ibera) is often confused with Hermann's tortoise (T. hermanni ). However, notable differences enable them to be distinguished.

Subspecies

The division of the Greek tortoise into subspecies is difficult and confusing. Given their huge range over three continents, the various terrains, climates, and biotopes have produced a huge number of varieties, with new subspecies constantly being discovered. Currently, at least 20 subspecies are published:
 T. g. graeca (North Africa and South Spain)
 T. g. soussensis (South Morocco)
 T. g. marokkensis (North Morocco)
 T. g. nabeulensis - Tunisian tortoise (Tunisia)
 T. g. cyrenaica (Libya)
 T. g. ibera (Turkey)
 T. g. armeniaca - Armenian tortoise (Armenia)
 T. g. buxtoni (Caspian Sea)
 T. g. terrestris (Israel/Lebanon)
 T. g. zarudnyi (Iran/Azerbaijan)
 T. g. whitei (Algeria)
 T. g. floweri (Jordan)

This incomplete listing shows the problems in the division of the species into subspecies. The differences in form are primarily in size and weight, as well as coloration, which ranges from dark brown to bright yellow, and the types of flecks, ranging from solid colors to many spots. Also, the bending-up of the edges of their carapaces ranges from minimal to pronounced. So as not to become lost in the number of subspecies, recently, a few tortoises previously classified as T. graeca have been assigned to different species, or even different genera.

The genetic richness of T. graeca is also shown in its crossbreeding. Tortoises of different form groups often mate, producing offspring with widely differing shapes and color. Perhaps the best means of identification for the future is simply the place of origin.

The smallest, and perhaps the prettiest, of the subspecies, is the Tunisian tortoise. It has a particularly bright and striking coloration. However, these are also the most sensitive tortoises of the species, so they cannot be kept outdoors in temperate climates, as cold and rainy summers quickly cause the animals to become ill. They are also incapable of long hibernation.

At the other extreme, animals from northeastern Turkey are very robust, such as Hermann's tortoise. The largest specimens come from Bulgaria. Specimens of  have been reported. In comparison, the Tunisian tortoise has a maximum weight of 0.7 kg (1.5 lb). T. graeca is also closely related to the marginated tortoise (T. marginata). The two species can interbreed, producing offspring capable of reproduction.

Sexing
Males of T. graeca differ from females in six main points. Firstly, they are generally smaller. Their tails are longer than females and taper to a point evenly, and the cloacal opening is farther from the base of the tail. The underside is somewhat curved, while females have a flat shell on the underside. The rear portion of a male's carapace is wider than it is long. Finally, the posterior plates of the carapace often flange outward.

Mating and reproduction

In T. graeca, immediately after waking from hibernation, the mating instinct starts up. The males follow the females with great interest, encircling them, biting them in the limbs, ramming them, and trying to mount them. During copulation, the male opens his mouth, showing his red tongue and making squeaking sounds.

During mating, the female stands still, bracing herself with her front legs, moving the front part of her body to the left and right in the same rhythm as the male's cries. One successful mating will allow the female to lay eggs multiple times. When breeding in captivity, the pairs of females and males must be kept separate. If multiple males are in a pen, one takes on a dominant role and will try to mate with the other males in the pen. If more males than females are in a pen, the males might kill each other to mate with the females.

One or two weeks before egg laying, the animals become notably agitated, moving around to smell and dig in the soil, even tasting it, before choosing the ideal spot to lay the eggs. One or two days before egg laying, the female takes on an aggressive, dominant behavior, mounting another animal as for copulation and making the same squeaking sound the male produces during copulation. The purpose of this behavior is to produce respect in the tortoise community so that the female will not be disturbed by the others during egg laying. Further details of egg-laying behavior are the same as those detailed for the marginated tortoise.

Trade
The Greek tortoise is commonly traded as a pet in source countries such as Morocco and Spain, despite the illegality of this trade. This can lead to an unsustainable removal of wild individuals for the local pet trade and for export. Also, welfare concerns exist with this trade, as the animals are not properly housed when being sold, causing a high rate of mortality in captivity.

Food
In captivity, the Greek tortoise loves dandelion leaves and other leafy plants. However, although they also enjoy eating lettuce, it is not recommended to them due to having a lack of nutrients that the tortoises need to survive.

See also
List of reptiles of Italy
Mediterranean tortoise
Timothy (tortoise)
Jackson ratio

References

External links

European Tortoises. (in German).
Broasca Testoasa Greaca - Testudo graeca. (in Romanian).

Testudo (genus)
Reptiles described in 1758
Tortoise
Fauna of Spain
Reptiles of Armenia
Reptiles of Azerbaijan
Turtles of Europe
Turtles of Asia
Species endangered by the pet trade
Taxa named by Carl Linnaeus
Reptiles of Russia
Reptiles as pets